The Rossi X-ray Timing Explorer (RXTE) was a NASA satellite that observed the time variation of astronomical X-ray sources, named after physicist Bruno Rossi. The RXTE had three instruments — an All Sky Monitor, the High-Energy X-ray Timing Experiment (HEXTE) and the Proportional Counter Array. The RXTE observed X-rays from black holes, neutron stars, X-ray pulsars and X-ray bursts. It was funded as part of the Explorer program, and was also called Explorer 69.

Its International Designator is 1995-074A.

Mission 
The X-Ray Timing Explorer (XTE) mission has the primary objective to study the temporal and broad-band spectral phenomena associated with stellar and galactic systems containing compact objects in the energy range 2--200 KeV, and in time scales from microseconds to years. The scientific instruments consists of two pointed instruments, the Proportional Counter Array (PCA) and the High-Energy X-ray Timing Experiment (HEXTE), and the All Sky Monitor (ASM), which scans over 70% of the sky each orbit. All of the XTE observing time were available to the international scientific community through a peer review of submitted proposals. XTE used a new spacecraft design that allows flexible operations through rapid pointing, high data rates, and nearly continuous receipt of data at the Science Operations Center (SOC) at Goddard Space Flight Center via a Multiple Access link to the Tracking and Data Relay Satellite System (TDRSS). XTE was highly maneuverable with a slew rate of greater than 6° per minute. The PCA/HEXTE could be pointed anywhere in the sky to an accuracy of less than 0.1°, with an aspect knowledge of around 1 arcminute. Rotatable solar panels enable anti-sunward pointing to coordinate with ground-based night-time observations. Two pointable high gain antennas maintain nearly continuous communication with the TDRSS. This, together with 1 GB (approximately four orbits) of on-board solid-state data storage, give added flexibility in scheduling observations.

Telecommunications 
 Required continuous TDRSS Multiple Access (MA) return link coverage except for zone of exclusion: Real time and playback of engineering/housekeeping data at 16 or 32 kbs - Playback of science data at 48 or 64 kbs.
 Requires 20 minutes of SSA contacts with alternating TDRSS per orbit: Real time and playback of engineering/housekeeping data at 32 kbs - Playback of science data at 512 or 1024 kbs.
 For launch and contingency, required TDRSS MA/SSA real time engineering and housekeeping at 1 kbs.
 The bit error rate shall be less than 1 in 10E8 for at least 95% of the orbits.

Instruments

All-Sky Monitor (ASM) 
The All-Sky Monitor (ASM) provided all-sky X-ray coverage, to a sensitivity of a few percent of the Crab Nebula intensity in one day, in order to provide both flare alarms and long-term intensity records of celestial X-ray sources. The instrumental properties were:

 Energy range: 2–12-keV
 Time resolution: observes 80% of the sky every 90 minutes
 Spatial resolution: 3' × 15'
 Number of shadow cameras: 3, each with 6° × 90° FoV
 Collecting area: 
 Detector: Xenon proportional counter, position-sensitive
 Sensitivity: 30 mCrab

It was built by the CSR at Massachusetts Institute of Technology. The principal investigator was Dr. Hale Bradt.

High Energy X-ray Timing Experiment (HEXTE) 
The High-Energy X-ray Timing Experiment (HEXTE) is a scintillator array for the study of temporal and temporal/spectral effects of the hard X-ray (20 to 200 keV) emission from galactic and extragalactic sources. The HEXTE consisted of two clusters each containing four phoswich scintillation detectors. Each cluster could "rock" (beamswitch) along mutually orthogonal directions to provide background measurements 1.5° or 3.0° away from the source every 16 to 128 seconds. In addition, the input was sampled at 8 microseconds so as to detect time varying phenomena. Automatic gain control was provided by using an  radioactive source mounted in each detector's field of view. The HEXTE's basic properties were:

 Energy range: 15–250-keV
 Energy resolution: 15% at 60-keV
 Time sampling: 8 microseconds
 Field of view: 1° FWHM
 Detectors: 2 clusters of 4 NaI/CsI scintillation counters
 Collecting area: 2 × 
 Sensitivity: 1-Crab = 360 count/second per HEXTE cluster
 Background: 50 count/second per HEXTE cluster

The HEXTE was designed and built by the Center for Astrophysics & Space Sciences (CASS) at the University of California, San Diego. The HEXTE principal investigator was Dr. Richard E. Rothschild.

Proportional Counter Array (PCA) 
The instrumental properties were:

 Energy range: 2–60-keV
 Energy resolution: <18% at 6-keV
 Time resolution: 1-μs
 Spatial resolution: collimator with 1° Full width at half maximum (FWHM)
 Detectors: 5 proportional counters
 Collecting area: 
 Layers: 1 propane veto; 3 Xenon, each split into two; 1 Xenon veto layer
 Sensitivity: 0.1-mCrab
 Background: 90-mCrab

The PCA is being built by the Laboratory for High Energy Astrophysics (LHEA) at Goddard Space Flight Center. The principal investigator was Dr. Jean H. Swank.

Results 
Observations from the Rossi X-ray Timing Explorer have been used as evidence for the existence of the frame-dragging effect predicted by the theory of general relativity of Einstein. RXTE results have, as of late 2007, been used in more than 1400 scientific papers.

In January 2006, it was announced that Rossi had been used to locate a candidate intermediate-mass black hole named M82 X-1. In February 2006, data from RXTE was used to prove that the diffuse background X-ray glow in our galaxy comes from innumerable, previously undetected white dwarfs and from other stars' coronae. In April 2008, RXTE data was used to infer the size of the smallest known black hole.

RXTE ceased science operations on 12 January 2012.

Atmospheric entry 
NASA scientists said that the decommissioned RXTE would re-enter the Earth's atmosphere "between 2014 and 2023". Later, it became clear that the satellite would re-enter in late April or early May 2018, and the spacecraft fell out of orbit on 30 April 2018.

See also 

 List of X-ray space telescopes
 Neutron Star Interior Composition Explorer (NICER, launched in June 2017 and attached to ISS)

References

External links 

 MIT's Rossi X-Ray Timing Explorer Project
 NASA RXTE Mission Site
 Video documentary
 Variations in the X-ray Sky by RXTE (1997)
 RXTE Reveals the Cloudy Cores of Active Galaxies

Spacecraft launched in 1995
Spacecraft which reentered in 2018
Explorers Program
Space telescopes
X-ray telescopes